Khiyavan (also Khiyaban, Azerbaijani: Xiyavan, Persian: خیابان) is one of the oldest districts of Tabriz. Khiyavan is restricted to Meydan River, Maralan district and Azadi Blvd. During the constitutional revolution of Iran, Khiyavan was under the command of Baqir Khan and had an important role in the victory of the revolution.

References 

Districts of Tabriz